Pelomonas puraquae is a Gram-negative, rod-shaped, non-spore-forming bacterium from the genus Pelomonas in the family Comamonadaceae. Colonies of P. puraquae are pale brown, with darker centers. It was first isolated from  haemodialysis water in Mallorca, Spain. The species name is derived from Latin purus (pure) and aqua (water).

References

External links
Type strain of Pelomonas puraquae at BacDive -  the Bacterial Diversity Metadatabase

Comamonadaceae
Bacteria described in 2005